Year 1239 (MCCXXXIX) was a common year starting on Saturday (link will display the full calendar) of the Julian calendar.

Events 
 By place 

 Europe 
 Summer – A German expeditionary force under Emperor Frederick II invades the Romagna and Tuscany, hoping to capture Rome. He appoints his 21-year-old son, Enzo of Sardinia, as imperial vicar general for Northern Italy. Frederick also threatens with war against Venice, who has sent ships to blockade the harbors on Sicily. In order to finance his growing need for arms, he institutes an administrative reorganization of the Holy Roman Empire (among others, the formation of 10 vice regencies in Italy).
 August – Siege of Faenza: Frederick II lays siege to the town of Faenza during the war of the Guelphs and Ghibellines. Meanwhile, Frederick makes an alliance with Pisa to support his campaign against the Papal States.
 Autumn – King Béla IV allows some 40,000 Cumans, pagan nomads fleeing the Mongols, to settle in Hungary between the rivers Danube and Theiss, after their leader, Köten, has promised to convert to Christianity.
 November – Pope Gregory IX grants the status of Crusade to King Ferdinand III (the Saint), who leads a successful campaign against the Almohads in Murcia.
 King Louis IX (the Saint) holds a parlement (or "court of law") at Paris, for the first time recorded in Ancien Régime France.

 England 
 June 17 or June 18 – Edward I (Longshanks), first son born to King Henry III and Queen Eleanor of Provence, is born at the Palace of Westminster. Henry names him after Edward the Confessor and chooses Simon de Montfort as his godfather.

 Levant 
 September 1 – Barons' Crusade: A Crusader force (some 1,500 knights) under King Theobald I of Navarre arrives at Acre. At a council of local barons – most prominently: Walter of Brienne, Odo of Montbéliard, Balian of Beirut, John of Arsuf, and Balian of Sidon, plans are made to prepare an expedition against the Ayyubids in Egypt. Later, Theobald is also joined by some Crusaders from Cyprus.
 November 2 – A expeditionary force (some 4,000 knights) under Theobald I sets out from Acre for the Egyptian frontier, detachments from the military orders and several local barons accompany the Crusaders. While marching to Jaffa, a Crusader column led by Peter of Brittany and his lieutenant Raoul de Soissons with two hundred knights, lays an ambush and attacks a rich Muslim caravan.
 November 12 – Sultan as-Salih Ayyub sends an Ayyubid army to Gaza to protect the Egyptian border. At nightfall, Henry of Bar, jealous of the successful ambush of Peter of Brittany, decides to march out towards Gaza with a Crusader force (some 500 knights and 1,000 soldiers). Although warned by Theobald I, Henry orders to set up camp in a flat terrain surrounded by sand dunes near Gaza.
 November 13 – Battle of Gaza: The Crusader army led by Henry of Bar is defeated by the Egyptians near Gaza. More than a thousand men are slaughtered, including Henry himself. Six hundred more are captured and carried off to Egypt. Among them are Amaury VI de Montfort and Philippe de Nanteuil – who, in the dungeons of Cairo, writes a Crusade song about the failure of the expedition.
 December 7 – Ayyubid forces under An-Nasir Dawud march on Jerusalem, which is largely undefended. The garrison of the city surrenders to Dawud, after accepting his offer for a safe-conduct to Acre. Dawud destroys Jerusalem's fortifications, including the Tower of David. Meanwhile, Theobald I (losing many men underway) moves with the remnants of the Crusader army northward to Acre.

 Mongol Empire 
 The Mongol invasion of Kievan Rus': The Mongols under Batu Khan continue their campaign across the Pontic Steppe. After devastating the Crimea and campaigning against the Circassians in the Caucasus, they turn towards the Kievan Rus'. In March, Pereyaslavl, capital of the Principality of Pereyaslavl, is sacked by the Mongols. 
 October 18 – Sack of Chernigov: The Mongols led by Batu Khan attack Chernigov, the garrison rallied outside the walls to face the Mongols in a pitched battle. Prince Mstislav III Glebovich comes to help with his troops, they are slaughtered by Mongol catapults. The city is pillaged as are the towns in the surrounding countryside.

 By topic 

 Arts and Humanities 
 In England the central tower of Lincoln Cathedral collapses.

 Religion 
 March 20 – Gregory IX renews the excommunication of Frederick II, while he is at his court in Padua. Frederick responds by expelling the Franciscans and Dominicans from Lombardy.

Births 
 June 17 or June 18 – Edward I (Longshanks), king of England (d. 1307)
 December 17 – Kujō Yoritsugu, Japanese ruler (shogun) (d. 1256)
 Álvaro (the Castilian), Spanish nobleman and knight  (d. 1268)
 Balian of Arsuf, Cypriot nobleman (House of Ibelin) (d. 1277)
 Constance of Aragon, Spanish princess (infanta) (d. 1269)
 John II of Brittany, French nobleman and knight (d. 1305)
 Robert de Ferrers, English nobleman and knight (d. 1279)
 Stephen V, king of Hungary (House of Árpád) (d. 1272)
 Thomas I of Saluzzo, Italian nobleman and knight (d. 1296)

Deaths 
 February 3 – Kujō Ninshi, Japanese empress consort (b. 1173)
 March 3 – Vladimir IV (Rurikovich), Kievan Grand Prince (b. 1187)
 March 20 – Hermann von Salza, German Grand Master (b. 1165)
 March 28 – Go-Toba (or Toba II), emperor of Japan (b. 1180)
 April 7 – William I de Cantilupe, Norman nobleman (b. 1159)
 June 5 – Władysław Odonic (the Spitter), Polish nobleman 
 September 21 – Simon of Dammartin, French nobleman 
 November 13 – Henry II of Bar, French nobleman (b. 1190)
 December 13 – Albert IV (the Wise), German nobleman
 December 21
 Henry de Turberville, English nobleman and knight
 Richard Wilton, English scholastic philosopher
 Abu al-Abbas al-Nabati, Andalusian pharmacist (b. 1166)
 Aimery III of  Narbonne (or Aimeric), French nobleman
 Ibn al-Khabbaza, Moroccan historian, poet and writer
 Ibn al-Mustawfi, Ayyubid governor and historian (b. 1169)
 Muhammad bin Hasan al-Baghdadi, Arab cuisine writer
 Robert of Courtenay, French nobleman and knight (b. 1168)
 Thomas of Capua, Italian prelate, cardinal and diplomat

References